Bainbridge Township is one of the sixteen townships of Geauga County, Ohio, United States and is a suburb of Cleveland. As of the 2020 census the population was 12,907.

Geography
Located in the southwestern corner of the county, it borders the following townships and cities:
Russell Township – north
South Russell – northwest
Newbury Township – northeast corner
Auburn Township – east
Mantua Township, Portage County – southeast corner
Aurora – south
Reminderville – southwest corner
Solon – west
Chagrin Falls – northwest, south of Bentleyville
Bentleyville – northwest, north of Chagrin Falls

No municipalities are located in Bainbridge Township, although the census-designated place of Bainbridge is located in the center of the township.

Name and history

Named for Commodore William Bainbridge, it is the only Bainbridge Township statewide.  The village of Bainbridge, Ohio, is located in Ross County, in Southern Ohio.

The first residents of Bainbridge were the McConougheys, who came from Blandford, Massachusetts. Many other settlers followed. In 1817, Bainbridge Township was established. The first housing subdivision, Lake Lucerne, opened in 1922. It is still one of the largest in Bainbridge.

The Geauga County Public Library opened a branch in Bainbridge in 1965. Initially located in a small storefront, the Bainbridge Library was expanded considerably upon moving to a new building.

In spring 2005, students at Kenston High School compiled the Bainbridge Historical Society's historical photographs into a browsable website.

Government
The township is governed by a three-member board of trustees, who are elected in November of odd-numbered years to a four-year term beginning on the following January 1. Two are elected in the year after the presidential election and one is elected in the year before it. There is also an elected township fiscal officer, who serves a four-year term beginning on April 1 of the year after the election, which is held in November of the year before the presidential election. Vacancies in the fiscal officership or on the board of trustees are filled by the remaining trustees.

Community fundraising

Community members have raised funds to support a variety of community activities over the years. Among  them are two annual events managed by The Bainbridge Men's Civic Club: The Taste of Bainbridge and the Ox Roast. The Taste of Bainbridge began in 1997; the first Ox Roast took place in 2012. For the Taste of Bainbridge, participating local restaurants prepare and serve menu items that are served to diners who donate an entry fee. The Ox Roast features more activities and fewer food vendors. All proceeds from both events go to community programs such as scholarships for students and the nonprofit Bainbridge Area Food for Friends. The Ox Roast is held at Centerville Mills Park,  a former YMCA camp now owned by the township.

References

External links
Township website
County website
Bainbridge Library (Part of the Geauga County Public Library)

Townships in Geauga County, Ohio
1817 establishments in Ohio
Populated places established in 1817
Townships in Ohio